Joseph Pearson may refer to:

 Joseph Pearson (politician) (1776–1834), Congressional Representative from North Carolina
 Joseph Pearson (zoologist) (1881–1971), British-born zoologist and marine biologist
 Joseph Pearson (footballer) (1868–?), English footballer
 Joseph Pearson (cricketer) (1860–1892), English cricketer
 Joseph Pearson (writer) (born 1975), Canadian essayist, cultural historian, and journalist
 Joseph Thurman Pearson Jr., American landscape and portrait painter

See also
 Joe Pearson (disambiguation)